Demuni Nuwan Tharanga Zoysa (born 13 May 1978), or Nuwan Zoysa, is a former Sri Lankan cricketer. He was a tall left-arm seam bowler, who played 30 Tests and 95 ODIs for Sri Lanka. Nuwan was educated at Isipathana College, Colombo.

In his eighth Test, Zoysa became the first player in the history to take a hat-trick off his first three balls of a Test match. He achieved this against Zimbabwe at Harare in November 1999, dismissing Trevor Gripper, Murray Goodwin and Neil Johnson.

International career
Zoysa made his first class debut in 1996/97 and during his first season he took his career best figures of 7 for 58, playing for Sinhalese Sports Club. He made his Test debut soon after in Dunedin against New Zealand. He has gone on to take over 100 ODI wickets for Sri Lanka, the ninth to have achieved the milestone.

An aggressive lower order batsman, Zoysa once won an ODI game against Australia with an unbeaten 47. Zoysa's golden era in international cricket came during 2004 season, where he was the main strike bowler accompany with Chaminda Vaas. He performed well in bat and ball in numerous occasions, enable to win many bilateral, tri-series and ICC major tournaments. His highest ODI score came against Australia. He has single Test and ODI fifer each as well.

Domestic career
He made his Twenty20 debut on 17 August 2004, for Sinhalese Sports Club in the 2004 SLC Twenty20 Tournament. He was also bought by the Deccan Chargers Franchise in the IPL but he was removed from the team for his poor performances.

Coaching
Nuwan Zoysa was appointed to the National Fast Bowling Coaching Department of Sri Lanka Cricket on 1 October 2015 prior to which he has worked in India with Goa Cricket Association and with Royal College & Nondiscripts as Fast Bowling Coach before joining SLC.

In October 2018, he was charged by the International Cricket Council (ICC) for three breaches of the ICC Anti-Corruption Code. In November 2020, he was found guilty of three offences, and in April 2021, he was handed a six-year ban, backdated to 31 October 2018.

References

External links

1978 births
Living people
Basnahira South cricketers
Sinhalese Sports Club cricketers
Sri Lanka One Day International cricketers
Sri Lanka Test cricketers
Sri Lankan cricketers
Test cricket hat-trick takers
Deccan Chargers cricketers
Kandurata cricketers
Cricketers at the 2010 Asian Games
Alumni of Isipathana College
Sri Lankan cricket coaches
Khulna Division cricketers
Asian Games competitors for Sri Lanka
Cricketers banned for corruption